Anochetus daedalus is a species of trap-jaw ant in the subfamily Ponerinae. It can be found from Western Ghats in India.

A. daedalus constructs nests in the form of an elaborate maze with horizontal galleries. They have long pincer like mandibles that snap shut on the prey like a bare trap.

References

Ponerinae